The Rohingya National Army (RNA) was a Rohingya insurgent group active in northern Rakhine State, Myanmar. It was the armed wing of the Arakan Rohingya National Organisation.

History 
On 28 October 1998, remnants of the Rohingya Solidarity Organisation's armed wing and the Arakan Rohingya Islamic Front merged and formed the Arakan Rohingya National Organisation (ARNO), with the RNA as the group's armed wing.

The RNA launched a joint operation with the Arakan Army on 5 April 2001, killing five Myanmar Army soldiers and wounding 12 others. According to RNA claims, the Myanmar Army suffered 20 casualties.

References 

Rebel groups in Myanmar
Paramilitary organisations based in Myanmar
Islamist groups
Islam in Myanmar
Rakhine State
Insurgency